American Fork is a city in north-central Utah County, Utah, United States, at the foot of Mount Timpanogos in the Wasatch Range, north from Utah Lake. This city is thirty-two miles southeast of Salt Lake City. It is part of the Provo–Orem Metropolitan Statistical Area. The population was 33,337 in 2020. The city has grown rapidly since the 1970s.

History

The area around Utah Lake was used as a seasonal hunting and fishing ground by the Ute Indians. American Fork was settled in 1850 by Mormon pioneers and incorporated as Lake City in 1852. The first settlers were Arza Adams, followed by Stephen Chipman (grandfather of Stephen L. Chipman, a prominent citizen around the start of the 20th Century), Ira Eldredge, John Eldredge and their families.

The first settlers of American Fork lived in scattered conditions along the American Fork river. By the 1850s, the tension between the settlers and Native Americans was increasing. In 1853, Daniel H. Wells, the head of the Nauvoo Legion (the Utah Territorial Militia at the time), instructed settlers to move into specific forts. At a meeting on July 23, 1853, at the schoolhouse in American Fork, Lorenzo Snow and Parley P. Pratt convinced the settlers to follow Wells' directions and all move together into a central fort. Only parts of the wall were built to eight feet high, and none were built to the original plan of twelve feet high.

Settlers changed the name from Lake City to American Fork in 1860. It was renamed after the American Fork, which runs through the city, to avoid confusion with Salt Lake City. Most residents were farmers and merchants during its early history. By the 1860s, American Fork had established a public school, making it the first community in the territory of Utah to offer public education to its citizens. In the 1870s, American Fork served as a rail access point for mining activities in American Fork Canyon. American Fork had "a literal social feud" with the town of Lehi due to the Utah Sugar Company choosing Lehi as the factory building site in 1890 instead of American Fork. There were several mercantile businesses in American Fork, such as the American Fork Co-operative Association and Chipman Mercantile. For several decades in the 1900s, raising chickens (and eggs) was an important industry in the city. In 1892, Joseph Forbes organized the schools in American Fork, and the Forbes school is named after him.

During World War II, the town population expanded when the Columbia Steel plant was built. An annual summer celebration in the city is still called "Steel Days" in honor of the economic importance of the mill, which closed in November 2001. The steel mill was located approximately six miles (10 km) southeast of town, on land on the east shore of Utah Lake.

American Fork built a city hospital in 1937. A new facility was built in 1950 and sold to Intermountain Healthcare in 1977, replacing that hospital with a new facility in 1980.

The 1992 film The Sandlot was mostly filmed on the Wasatch Front. The carnival scene was filmed in American Fork on State Street by Robinson Park.

Several scenes from the 1984 movie Footloose were also filmed in American Fork, including the opening scene inside the church, the front porch scene with Kevin Bacon and his family, and the gas station scene in which Bacon refuels his Volkswagen.

Geography

According to the United States Census Bureau, the city has a total area of 9.2 square miles (23.9 km), all land.

Demographics

As of the census of 2010, there were 26,263 people in 7,098 households residing in the city. The population density was 2,853.7 people per square mile (1,101.5/km). The racial makeup of the city was 88.8% White (non-Hispanic), 7.4% Hispanic or Latino. 0.9% Asian, 0.5% Native American, 0.5% Pacific Islander, 0.4% African American, and 2.4% from two or more races. 3.5% of the population were foreign-born.

37.7% of the population were under 18 years old (10.6% under 5); 8.7% were 65 or older. 49.9% of the population were female. 7.1% identified themselves as being either bisexual or homosexual. 89.5% of persons over 25 had high school degrees, and 30.9% had bachelor's degrees or higher.

The median income for a household in the city was $67,124. 6.0% of the population were below the poverty line. The homeownership rate was 77.5%. There were 7,598 housing units. The median value of owner-occupied housing units was $210,600.

In 2007 there were 2,754 businesses in the city, with total retail sales of over $724 million.

Religious history

The first ward of the Church of Jesus Christ of Latter-day Saints (LDS Church) in American Fork was organized in 1851 with Leonard E. Harrington as bishop. As of 2022, there are seven stakes headquartered in the city as well as Mount Timpanogos Utah Temple, which was dedicated in 1996.

While the majority of the population are members of the LDS Church, there are several other faith communities in the city. The Community Presbyterian Church of American Fork was organized in 1877. In 1973 St. Peter's Catholic Parish was organized in American Fork. Additional faith groups or churches include Jehovah's Witnesses, Calvary Chapel, and Faith Independent Baptist Church.

Education

Public schools in American Fork are part of the Alpine School District and include a senior high school (American Fork High School), junior high school (American Fork Jr. High), and five elementary schools (Barratt Elementary, Forbes Elementary, Greenwood Elementary, Legacy Elementary, and Shelley Elementary). Shane Farnsworth is the Superintendent of Schools.

Private schools include American Heritage School.

Transportation 
In 2012, the FrontRunner commuter rail line began operation in Utah County, opening the American Fork station.

Notable people
 Paul Dayton Bailey – author and owner of Westernlore Press
 Merrill J. Bateman – emeritus general authority of the LDS Church and former President of Brigham Young University
 Wayne Booth – literary Scholar at the University of Chicago
 Reva Beck Bosone – first female U.S. Representative from Utah
 Witney Carson – ballroom dancer on Dancing with the Stars and participant on So You Think You Can Dance
 Stephen L. Chipman, prominent LDS Church leader and businessman.
 D. Todd Christofferson - LDS Church leader and current member of the Quorum of the Twelve Apostles
 Gary Herbert – former Governor of Utah
 Grant Liddle – endocrinologist
 Mia Love – U.S. Representative from Utah's 4th Congressional District
 Brandon Sanderson – fantasy author
 MyKayla Skinner – artistic gymnast, Olympic silver medalist
 Daniel Wayne Sermon – lead guitarist in the rock band Imagine Dragons
 James LeVoy Sorenson – medical inventor
 Andrew Tolman – drums, percussion, backing vocals, rhythm guitar formerly of the rock band Imagine Dragons

Exchange program 
American Fork has an inter-city exchange program with Indio, California, U.S. in a way similar to an international Sister City.

See also

 List of cities and towns in Utah

References

External links

 
 Early schools in American Fork, MSS 2832 at L. Tom Perry Special Collections, Harold B. Lee Library, Brigham Young University

 
Cities in Utah
Populated places established in 1850
Provo–Orem metropolitan area
Cities in Utah County, Utah